Tacca palmata is a plant in the Dioscoreaceae family, native to Borneo, Cambodia, Indonesia, Malaysia, New Guinea, Philippines, Sulawesi, Sumatra, Thailand, and Vietnam.

It was first described by Carl Ludwig Blume in 1827.

References

External links
Tacca palmata images & occurrence data from the GBIF

Tacca palmata
Flora of tropical Asia
Taxa named by Carl Ludwig Blume
Plants described in 1827